Trichapion is a genus of weevil in the family Brentidae.

Species include:
Trichapion aurichalceum (type species)
Trichapion lativentre (sesbania flower weevil)
Trichapion nigrum
Trichapion porcatum
Trichapion rostrum (baptisia seed pod weevil)

Several Trichapion species were formerly included in genus Apion.

References

External links

Brentidae